Liégeois is a French word that may refer to:
of or relating to Liège.
Walloon language
Café liégeois
Philippe Liégeois
a non-alcoholic mixed drink